is a railway station in Miyakonojō, Miyazaki, Japan.

Lines

Layout 
The station, which is unstaffed, consists of an island platform serving two tracks. The station building is a modern steel frame structure which houses a waiting area and an automatic ticket vending machine. Access to the island platform is by means of a footbridge.

Adjacent stations

History
The track was extended east in phases, with Yamanokuchi opening as the new terminus on 15 August 1914. By 21 September 1917, the track had reached  and line was renamed the Miyazaki Main Line. On 15 December 1923, Yamanokuchi was designated as part of the Nippō Main Line together with the entire stretch through Miyazaki to Yoshimatsu. With the privatization of Japanese National Railways (JNR), the successor of JGR, on 1 April 1987, the station came under the control of JR Kyushu.

Passenger statistics
In fiscal 2016, the station was used by an average of 194 passengers (boarding only) per day.

See also
List of railway stations in Japan

References

External links
Yamanokuchi (JR Kyushu)

Railway stations in Miyazaki Prefecture
Railway stations in Japan opened in 1914